Boynitsa Municipality is a small frontier municipality (obshtina) in Vidin Province, Northwestern Bulgaria, located in the Danubian Plain about 20 km southwest of Danube river. It is named after its administrative centre - the village of Boynitsa. The area borders on the Republic of Serbia to the west and northwest.

Settlements 

Boynitsa Municipality includes the following 8 places all of them villages:

Demography 
The following table shows the change of the population during the last four decades.

Vital statistics 
As of most recent statistics from 2021, the population of Boynitsa dropped further to 780 people. There were only 2 births recorded and 54 deaths. That means that the population dropped by 52 people, because of natural increase. In the period between 2000-2021 there were a total of 112 births recorded. The number of deaths in the same period was 1,627. That means that the population of Boynitsa declined by 1,515 people just because the fact more people are dying than that being born. Boynitsa is one of the smallest municipalities by population (only Treklyano Municipality has a smaller population).

Religion 
According to the latest Bulgarian census of 2011, the religious composition, among those who answered the optional question on religious identification, was the following:

See also
Provinces of Bulgaria
Municipalities of Bulgaria
List of cities and towns in Bulgaria

References

External links
 Info website 

Municipalities of Vidin Province